Victor Ivanovich Buturlin (28 June 1946 – 5 February 2022) was a Russian film director and screenwriter. He died in Saint Petersburg on 5 February 2022, at the age of 75.

Partial filmography
 Applause, Applause...
 The Gardener

References

External links
 

1946 births
2022 deaths
Soviet film directors
Soviet screenwriters
Russian film directors
20th-century Russian screenwriters
Male screenwriters
20th-century Russian male writers
Russian State Institute of Performing Arts alumni
High Courses for Scriptwriters and Film Directors alumni
Mass media people from Moscow